Home, Home on the Road is an album by the American country rock group the New Riders of the Purple Sage.  Released by Columbia Records in 1974, it was their first live album, and their fifth album overall.  The eleven songs on the album are a combination of originals and covers.  Six of them had appeared on previous New Riders albums, and five had not.

Home, Home on the Road was produced by Jerry Garcia of the Grateful Dead, who had co-founded the New Riders and had been their original pedal steel guitar player.  One track, "Kick in the Head", was written by Robert Hunter, who wrote the lyrics to many Grateful Dead songs.

Track listing

"Hi, Hello, How Are You" (John Dawson)
"She's No Angel" (J.W. Arnold, Wanda Ballman)
"Groupie" (Dave Torbert)
"Sunday Susie" (Dawson)
"Kick in the Head" (Robert Hunter)
"Truck Drivin' Man" (Terry Fell)
"Hello Mary Lou" (Gene Pitney, C. Mangiaracina)
"Sutter's Mill" (Dawson)
"Dead Flowers" (Mick Jagger, Keith Richards)
"Henry" (Dawson)
"School Days" (Chuck Berry)

Personnel

New Riders of the Purple Sage
John Dawson – guitar, vocals
David Nelson – guitar, vocals
Dave Torbert – bass, vocals
Buddy Cage – pedal steel guitar
Spencer Dryden – drums

Additional musicians
Andy Stein – baritone sax on "School Days"

Production
Jerry Garcia – producer
Tom Flye – recording and remix engineer
Bob Edwards – sound engineer
Tom Lubin – assistant engineer
Chris Harms – cover art
Recorded on the Record Plant NY White Truck with Frank Hubach, David Hewitt, John L. Venable
Cover photography: Jamie Eric Eisman

Notes

References

"Home, Home on the Road" on deaddisc.com
"Major Releases" partial discography on NRPS official website nrps.net

New Riders of the Purple Sage live albums
1974 live albums
Columbia Records live albums
Albums produced by Jerry Garcia